Hoey is an Irish surname. Spelling variations include: O'Hoey, Haughey, McCaughey and McKeogh, among others. The original Irish spelling is Ó hEochaidh.

The Hoeys are descendants of the ancient Dál Fiatach dynasty, rulers of the Ulaid and formers kings of Ulster. They trace their descent from Fiatach Finn mac Dáire, a King of Ulster and High King of Ireland in the 1st Century AD.

Hoey also is a surname found in some native Cambodians and Indonesians, who may include those of Chinese descent.

Notable people with Hoey surname

Allen Hoey (1952–2010), American poet, novelist, and literary critic
Aoife Hoey (born 1983), Irish bobsledder
Charles Ferguson Hoey (1914–1944), Canadian recipient of the Victoria Cross
Clyde R. Hoey (1877–1954), American politician in North Carolina
Colleen A. Hoey, American diplomat
Dennis Hoey (1893–1960), British film and stage actor
Evelyn Hoey (1910–1935), American singer and actor
Frances Sarah Hoey (1830–1908), Irish novelist
Fred Hoey (1884–1949), American baseball broadcaster in Boston
Fred Hoey (baseball manager) (1865–1933), American baseball manager in New York City
Gary Hoey (born 1960), American guitarist, singer and songwriter
Iris Hoey (1885–1979), British actress
James Hoey (disambiguation), several people
Kate Hoey (born 1946), Irish Republican politician
Kelly Hoey, American author
Lori Hoey
Margaret Gardner Hoey (1875–1942), American political hostess
Marty Hoey (1951–1982), American mountaineer
Michael Hoey (disambiguation), several people
Rob Hoey (born 1980), English musician, actor, writer and comedian 
Robert Hoey (1883–1965), Canadian politician in Manitoba
Una Raymond-Hoey (born 1996), Irish cricketer
Rachel (Hoey) Hatton (born 1968), American Author

See also
Hoey, Saskatchewan, a hamlet in Canada
Haughey
Kings of Ulster
Dál Fiatach
Ulaid

References

External links
Kingdom of Ulster

Ulaid
Surnames of Irish origin
Anglicised Irish-language surnames
Surnames of British Isles origin